Malcolm Donald Reid (1857 – 16 March 1933) was a South Australian timber merchant and businessman, founder of several furniture stores that bore his name.

History
Malcolm Donald Reid was born in Adelaide to John Harper Reid (c. 1829 – 25 September 1891) and Bridget Reid, née Carragher ( –1882) who married in 1852. John arrived in SA c. 1849, possibly aboard Competitor, October 1848. Bridget may have been one of two servants (with sister Ellen who married Edward Fowler in 1852) who are thought to have arrived on Mary Clarke in July 1849.
He has been reported as receiving his education at Martin Allen's Port Adelaide Academy, but this may be a confusion with McLaughlin's school of the same name in Dale Street. 
His first job was as a clerk with D. & J. Fowler, then with a local builder, which gave him an insight into the timber business. When the discovery of silver at Broken Hill became known, Reid lost no time in establishing a timber business there, counting on the vast requirement for shoring timbers such a mine would require, as well as the sheds, businesses and houses that would soon be built. He later opened a furniture shop, presumably to cater for the influx of the young married couples settling in the town.

He established a timber business on St. Vincent Street, Port Adelaide late in 1882, which with James Thomas Russell became Russell, Reid & Dickson. This company was dissolved in 1887 and Henry Emes taken on as partner, Emes retiring in December 1890.

In 1892 he took over the premises previously operated by C. Segar at 148 Rundle Street as a furniture showroom, specialising in better-quality English and Australian-made furniture. The shop was later described as "next door to Foy & Gibson's".

The business was reformed as Malcolm Reid & Co. Ltd. in 1911.

They opened a store in Bourke Street, Melbourne in 1936.

Their store in King William Street was taken over in 1947 by a new home furnishing company, Reid's Ltd, of which  Malcolm Reid & Co. Ltd. owned all ordinary shares. In 1950 a one-for-one issue of bonus shares was made to Malcolm Reid & Co. Ltd., realizing a substantial book profit.
In 1951 a new company, Malcolm Reid and Co. (Vic.) Pty. Ltd., was floated, and purchased the Victorian assets from Malcolm Reid & Co. Ltd.

Other interests
Reid was elected councillor for the Adelaide City Council, and was nominated for mayor in 1897, but was beaten by Arthur Ware.

Family
Malcolm Donald Reid (11 December 1857 – 16 March 1933) married Elizabeth Eleanor Purches ( – 1923) in 1880. She died in Marseilles. Their family included:
Rosa Reid (8 November 1880 – 3 October 1971) never married, lived in Adelaide
Malcolm Purches Reid (30 July 1882 – 27 October 1876) was proprietor of Globe Timber Mills 
Donald Malcolm Reid ( – ) married Elizabeth Pauline Berkeley Bronner (1919– ) on 6 August 1940. Elizabeth was the daughter of ABC executive Richard Bronner.
Harold Ernest Reid (1884 – 28 February 1970) married Marion Chandler Sandford in 1911, with Reid Bros. 
Reginald Harper "Reg" Reid (1886 – 14 September 1918) He served as Captain with the 153rd Brigade, Royal Field Artillery, and was killed in action in France.
Sidney Donald Reid (23 April 1888 – 6 September 1971) married Elma Thomson Kidman (1887–1970) in 1911. He was manager for Sir Sidney Kidman; she was a daughter. 
Douglas Burns Reid (13 November 1890 – 30 June 1977) (Vanderfield & Reid, timber merchants, Sydney), 
Clifford Albert Reid (1896 – 15 June 1985) married Bernice Meta Castine in 1921 (Malcolm Reid & Co. Adelaide)
Arnold Norman Reid (17 July 1899 – 15 November 1874) married Marion Collison in 1930 (Malcolm Reid & Co. Adelaide)
He married again to Edith Beatrice Elliott ( – 12 June 1966).
Reid died at his home "Felton" at 91 LeFevre Terrace, North Adelaide after suffering a year of declining health.

References 

1857 births
1933 deaths
Australian timber merchants
History of Broken Hill